Dexter Park was a horse race track in Chicago built in the years following the Civil War. It was named for a gelding and trotter who had set world records for the mile and inspired the naming of several new towns including Dexter, Missouri and Dexter, Texas (a village about an hour north of Dallas). The track's formal opening was held in July 1867.

Early baseball games at Dexter Park that July included a series staged for the touring Washington Nationals. The Nationals had been undefeated until they played the Forest City (Rockford) club, which defeated the Nationals 29-23. This generated a good deal of excitement for a game the next day against the Chicago champions, the Excelsior club. The Nationals proceeded to pummel the Excelsiors 49-4. Some Chicago fans, and local newspapers, accused the Nationals of being "blacklegs", i.e. of having lost to Forest City on purpose, to hype interest in the Excelsior match and the attendant wagering. The Nats complained, and the newspapers retracted their accusations.

Dexter Park was the first home of the Chicago White Stockings, one of the oldest professional baseball clubs in operation. Chicago's sporting businessmen formed the White Stockings in 1870 to represent Chicago as the Red Stockings had done for Cincinnati in 1869. The ball field was established inside the track's oval and had its own small set of bleachers encircling the field.

When the National Association of Professional Base Ball Players formed in 1871, the White Stockings joined the new league and relocated to the lakefront, at Union Base-Ball Grounds. That move proved ill-fated, as it put the team's home field in the path of the Great Chicago Fire; the club did not field another professional team for two years while it nursed its financial position.

Dexter Park was situated on the west side of Halsted Street, between 47th Street to the south and the imaginary line of 42nd Street to the north. This property was owned by, and adjacent to, the Union Stock Yards. The "bird's-eye view" of the stockyards, from ca. 1878, shows part of the race track at the left edge.

The track had ceased to be a working race track by 1880. By then it had been cut through by several of the Stock Yards' local roads and railroad spurs.[Chicago Inter Ocean, May 22, 1880, p.7] Its main usage had become conventions and cattle auctions. The last "race" mentioned in the local newspapers came in December 1881, a 100 yard dash contested (for betting) by two Stock Yards employees "on the old Dexter Park race track".[Chicago Inter Ocean, December 5, 1881, p.6]

Dexter Park Pavilion is first mentioned in local newspapers in 1884.[Chicago Inter Ocean, May 22, 1884, p.15] The Pavilion was the site of the famous wrestling bout contested between George Hackenschmidt and Frank Gotch in 1908, in what was considered professional wrestling's first true world championship bout. 

By 1909, the Pavilion had been renamed the International Amphitheater (I), but the two names were used synonymously in local papers. A marathon was staged between Olympic runners Dorando Pietri and Albert Corey.[Chicago Tribune, January 22, 1909, p.6]

The Pavilion / Amphitheater was used for various exhibitions until May 19, 1934,[Chicago Tribune, May 20, 1934, pp.1&5] when it was destroyed by fire.

A new arena, the International Amphitheater (II) was built on its site. The racetrack was commemorated by a road to the west of the arena, called Dexter Park Avenue.

References

External links
Jack Bales, "Ballparks," WrigleyIvy.com.
Jack Bales, Before They Were the Cubs: The Early Years of Chicago’s First Professional Baseball Team.  Jefferson, NC: McFarland, 2019.
 Chicago History
 Early Chicago racetracks
 Library of Congress map of Chicago showing Dexter Park, supposed to be 1892
 Sanborn map showing Dexter Park Horse Exchange and Exposition Building, 1901
 Detailed info including the 1867 games

Baseball venues in Chicago
Wrestling venues in Chicago
Sports venues in Chicago
1934 disestablishments in Illinois
Defunct horse racing venues in Illinois